"End of Green" is a song by Kerbdog and their second single released in 1993 on Vertigo Records, taken from their self titled debut album. The two b-sides are covers. "In a Rut" was originally a song by The Ruts (their first single from 1978) and "Kerosene" was originally by Big Black from their debut album Atomizer.

Tracks 2 & 3 recorded at Sound Studios, Dublin, by Pat Dunne assisted by Lorcan Cousins. The single was released on CD and 7" vinyl. There was also a promo only 12" vinyl.

Track listing
"End of Green"
"In a Rut"
"Kerosene"

1993 singles
Kerbdog songs
1993 songs
Vertigo Records singles
Songs written by Cormac Battle